The Ahr Wine Queen is a young woman from the German wine region of Ahr in the state of Rhineland-Palatinate who is elected for a year to represent and promote the wine industry of that region. The title has been awarded since 1951. Since 1973 she has been elected at the annual Wine Market of the Ahr (Weinmarkt der Ahr). Hitherto the queen had been chosen at various other ceremonies. In the year following her 'reign' the Ahr Wine Queen is eligible to run for the contest to elect the German Wine Queen.

List of Ahr Wine Queens

External links 
 Information at www.ahrwein.de
 List of regional wine queens
 Election for the German Wine Queen

!